Francis Anthony Gomes (April 10, 1931 – February 17, 2011) was the Roman Catholic
bishop of the Roman Catholic Diocese of Mymensingh, Bangladesh.

Ordained in 1959, Gomes was appointed bishop of the Mymensingh Diocese in 1987 and retired in 2006.

He died on the 17 February 2011 at the age of 79.

Notes

1931 births
2011 deaths
20th-century Roman Catholic bishops in Bangladesh
21st-century Roman Catholic bishops in Bangladesh
Roman Catholic bishops of Mymensingh